Wolf Henrik von Kalnein (died 27 August 1690) was a Prussian noblemen in Danish service. His most notable contributions were as acting governor of the Danish colony Tranquebar in India, and as colonel in the Danish Auxiliary Corps in Ireland, where he was killed in action at the siege of Limerick.

Having been in Brandenburg, French, and Dutch service, Kalnein came into Danish service in 1677, as a captain in the Regiment von Lehndorf, loaned by the Elector of Brandenburg to the King of Denmark; together with Ernst von Tettau and other brother officers. As such Kalnein participated in the invasion of Rugen 1678. The following year he was promoted to major, and brevetted lieutenant-colonel, and participated in the defence of Helsingör. After the war Kalnein was put on half-pay, but made commandant of Korsør 1680. In 1683 he was promoted to lieutenant-colonel in the Marine Regiment. 

As a young man, Kalnein had served in the Dutch East Indies. He was therefore made royal commissioner with the task of investigating irregularities allegedly committed by the Danish East India Company governor of Tranquebar, Axel Juel. Kalnein travelled to India on three merchant-men, accompanied by some military specialists who would restore the defences of Fort Dansborg. He returned in 1687 with Governor Juel as prisoner, and with four captured privateers and a captured English ship that had sailed under the Mughal flag. Returning to the army as a colonel in 1688, Kalnein was the following year made commander of Prince Frederick's Battalion in the Danish Auxiliary Corps in Ireland. He was killed in action leading his battalion in the failed assault on Limerick 1690.

References

Notes

Cited literature
 Bricka, Carl Fredrik (1887-1905). Dansk Biografisk Lexikon. Kjøbenhavn.
 Diller, Stephan (1999). Die Dänen in Indien, Südostasien und China (1620-1845). Wiesbaden.
 Engelstoft, Povl & Dahl, Svend (1932-1944). Dansk Biografisk Leksikon. København.

1690 deaths
Danish military officers
Danish military personnel killed in action
17th-century Danish people
Prussian nobility